Susan Prior  is an Australian actress.

Early life and education 
Susan prior graduated from the National Institute of Dramatic Art in Sydney.

Career 
Prior has worked extensively with the Sydney Theatre Company, including Riflemind, as well as acting in films and television series.

In early 2022 Prior played one of the lead roles, as Martha, in a State Theatre Company South Australia production of Edward Albee's Who's Afraid of Virginia Woolf?, to acclaim by critics.

Awards 
She won the 2014 AACTA Award for Best Actress in a Supporting Role for her role in The Rover and was nominated for the 2012 AACTA Award for Best Guest or Supporting Actress in a Television Drama for Puberty Blues. She was twice nominated for the Helpmann Award for Best Female Actor in a Supporting Role in a Play, in 2008 for Riflemind and in 2014 for Small and Tired.

Filmography
TV
 Aftertaste (2021) - Denise 
Frayed (2019) TV series - Ruth (2 episodes)
The Other Guy (2019) TV series - Sharon (1 epeisodes) 
Glitch (2019) TV series - Anne Donohue (3 episode)
Les Norton (2019) TV Series - Chenille (3 episode)
Jade of Death (2018) Web series - Donna (2 episodes)
Fighting Season (2018) TV mini series - Dr Linda (2 episodes)
Bite Club (2018) TV series - Tricia Martonotti (1 episode)
Safe Harbour (2018) TV mini series - Renee (3 episodes)
Riot! (2018) TV movie - Norma Gowland
Doctor Doctor (2017) TV series - Minnie (3 episodes)
Top of the Lake (2017) TV series - Becky (1 episode)
Love Child (2015) TV series - Geraldine Donnelly (1 episode)
Puberty Blues (2012–14) TV series - Yvonne Hennessey (17 episodes)
Rake (2012) TV series - Barbara (1 episode)
Home and Away (2012) TV series - Margaret Henderson (6 episodes)
Two Twisted (2006) TV series - Nurse Hughes (1 episode)
All Saints (2005) TV series - Beth Chandler (15 episodes)
Farscape (2002) TV series - Kiryah (1 episode)
Young Lions (2002) TV series - Christine Malouf (1 episode)
Water Rats (2000) TV series - Rosie Callaghan (2 episodes)
House Gang (1996) TV series - Lucy's mum (1 episode)
Police Rescue (1996) TV series - Debra (1 episodes)
G.P. (1995) TV series - Linda Swanson (1 episodes)
Film
Book Week (2018) - Lee Issen
Jasper Jones (2017) - Gwyn Wishart
The Rover (2014) - Dorothy Peeples
Not Suitable for Children (2012) - Marcie
Careless Love (2012) - Lee
Animal Kingdom (2010) - Alicia Henry
The View from Greenhaven (2008) - Kate
Suburban Mayhem (2008) - Christine Andretti
A Divided Heart (2005) - Millie Vickery
A Cold Summer (2003) - Phaedra
A Wreck A Tangle (2000) - Eleanor
Praise (1998) - Sophie
Heaven's Burning (1997) - Sharon
Idiot Box (1996) - Luce
Muriel's Wedding (1994) - Girl at Wedding

References

External links
 

Best Supporting Actress AACTA Award winners
Australian film actresses
Australian television actresses
Australian stage actresses
Living people
Year of birth missing (living people)